Bao'an County, formerly named Xin'an County, was a historical county in South China. It roughly follows the administrative boundaries of modern-day Hong Kong and the city of Shenzhen. For most of its history, the administrative center of the county was in Nantou.

History
During the Three Kingdoms, the later Bao'an County, along with Dongguan and Boluo counties, formed a single large district with the name Boluo.

In 331, the Eastern Jin Dynasty established Bao'an County, one of six counties under Dōngguān Prefecture. This prefecture's area included modern Shenzhen and Dongguan. In the second year of the Zhide of Suzong under the Tang Dynasty (757 AD), Dōngguān was renamed to Dōngguǎn.

In the 27th year of Hongwu Emperor's (1368–1399, founder of the Ming dynasty) reign, Hongwu appointed an officer with the title Shou-yu-suo to protect the local population from robbers and vagabonds which increasingly infested the district.

In 1573, the first year of the reign of Wanli of the Ming Dynasty, Xin'an County (sometimes referred to as district) was established as a separate administrative division of Guangzhou Prefecture. The area was then separated from the old Dongguan County due to military reasons.

Under the Qing Dynasty, Xin'an County was one of the fourteen districts under the department of Guangdong. During the Great Clearance (1661–1669), most of Xin'an County was affected by the coastal evacuation. However Xin'an ceased to be a separate administrative county by the 5th year of Kangxi (1666), and the areas not affected by the evacuation were temporarily absorbed into the adjoining Dongguan County until the lift of the ban in 1669. From 1842 to 1898, 1055.61 km2 out of 3076 km2 of Xin'an County was ceded to the United Kingdom to form Hong Kong.

Population
According to the 1819 edition of the Gazetteer of Xin'an County, the population of Xin'an County was about 18,000 people in 1642, just prior to the collapse of the Ming dynasty, and the total population was about 4,000 by 1672, three years after the reoccupation of the area at the end of the Great Clearance.

Cession of Hong Kong 

The area commonly referred to as Hong Kong was successively ceded or leased from the county to Britain in 1842, 1860 and 1898 under the Treaty of Nanking (Hong Kong Island), Convention of Peking (Kowloon), and Convention for the Extension of Hong Kong Territory (New Territories).

Republic of China era
After the founding of the Republic of China in 1913, the name of Xin'an was changed back to Bao'an.

People's Republic of China era 

In 1953, Shenzhen replaced Nantou as the administrative centre, due to the increasing prominence of the town as the southern terminus of the Chinese section of the Kowloon–Canton Railway.

In 1979, Bao'an County was renamed Shenzhen City after the name of its county town since 1953, and the southern part of Shenzhen became a Special Economic Zone a year later. A diminished Bao'an County remained in the new city of Shenzhen outside the SEZ until 1992, when it was replaced by the Bao'an and the Longgang districts.

See also 

 History of Hong Kong under Imperial China
 Gazetteer of Xin'an County

References

Citations

Sources 

 Mr. Krone (1859). A Notice of the Sanon District, Transactions, Vol. 6, pp. 71–105, Hong Kong (1859).

Further reading 
 
  - Published online on 21 October 2010.

Former counties of China
County-level divisions of Guangdong
History of Hong Kong
History of Shenzhen
Dongguan
330s establishments
4th-century BC establishments in China
1979 disestablishments in Asia
1970s disestablishments in Hong Kong
1970s disestablishments in China